West Lindsey is a local government district in Lincolnshire, England. Its council is based in Gainsborough.

History

The district was formed on 1 April 1974, from the urban districts of Gainsborough, Market Rasen, along with Caistor Rural District, Gainsborough Rural District and Welton Rural District, all in the historic Parts of Lindsey.  The district council moved to new offices in Marshall's Yard in Gainsborough in January 2008.

In the 2016 EU referendum, West Lindsey voted 61.8% leave (33,847 votes) to 38.2% remain (20,906 votes).

Governance

Councillors are elected to the authority every four years, with 36 councillors representing 20 wards. Between 1974 and 2011 the council was elected in 'thirds' - this means that elections were held every year apart from the fourth year when County Council elections were held. In December 2010 the Council decided to change the system from 'thirds' to 'all out' elections commencing in May 2011.

The most recent election to the council was held in May 2019. 36 members were elected, representing 20 wards. The result produced a council with no party having an outright majority. The current membership of the council is Conservatives 16, Liberal Democrats 13, Gainsborough Independents 2, Lincolnshire Independents 2 and Independent 3.

On 15 January 2016, Councillors agreed with the proposals recommended by West Lindsey District Council's Independent Remuneration Panel and accepted a 1% increase in their basic allowances, effective from the 2016 civic year, which is inline with the pay award offered to staff over the same period.

Geography
West Lindsey borders North Lincolnshire and North East Lincolnshire to the north, East Lindsey to the east, North Kesteven and the city of Lincoln to the south, and the county of Nottinghamshire to the west.

It covers Gainsborough, Market Rasen, Sudbrooke, Fiskerton, Reepham, Cherry Willingham, Nettleham, Welton, Caistor, and Keelby.

The boundary of the district in the west borders the River Trent, and meets Nottinghamshire (Bassetlaw) and North Lincolnshire at East Stockwith, close to Wildsworth. On the other side of the Trent is Gunthorpe, Lincolnshire. It deviates from the Trent, to the east along the River Eau at Scotter, where it meets Messingham in North Lincolnshire. The boundary deviates southwards near Scotton, then at Northorpe follows the B1205 eastwards, crossing the A15 at Waddingham. It follows the Sallowrow Drain to the Old River Ancholme at South Kelsey, which it follows northwards. At North Kelsey, it deviates from the Old River Ancholme, following the North Kelsey Beck eastwards. This crosses the B1434 then the Newark-Grimsby railway line, where at Searby cum Owmby it follows a drain parallel to the railway line northwards, and at Bigby it follows Kettleby Beck westwards across the railway line back to the Old River Ancholme, which it follows for almost a mile towards Brigg. The Bigby parish is the northern part of West Lindsey that skirts the southern edge of Brigg, crossing the A1084 and the railway line.

Also in Bigby, it crosses the Scunthorpe-Grimsby line, then three railway lines together at Wrawby Junction. North of Bigby village it crosses the western escarpment of the northern Lincolnshire Wolds, then skirts the southern and eastern perimeter of Humberside Airport. It crosses the A18 and B1210, then the B1211. The furthest north section of the district, and of the county, is where it meets a short section of the A180, where a few hundred metres west of the A160 interchange it meets North East Lincolnshire. It follows the New Beck Drain south-east across the B1210, and at Riby, the A1173 and A18. At Swallow it crosses the A46. It follows the Waithe Beck at Thorganby. At Swinhope it meets East Lindsey, next to Scallows Hall (in East Lindsey), and crosses the B1203, then again at Kirmond le Mire. It meets the B1225 High Street at Tealby, and for around two miles southwards is the district boundary, crossing the A631 at North Willingham. At Sixhills it deviates westwards from the B1225, next to the former RAF Ludford Magna (in East Lindsey). At Holton cum Beckering it crosses the B1202, then the A158 at Goltho, where it skirts the western edge of Wragby (in East Lindsey). It passes southwards in Bardney through Chamber's Farm Wood (mostly in East Lindsey); Chamber's Farm itself is in West Lindsey. It skirts the southern edge of the former RAF Bardney, and crosses the B1190 near Tupholme Abbey (in East Lindsey). East of Southrey (also in Bardney parish) it meets the River Witham and North Kesteven. It follows the River Witham westwards until Greetwell where it meets the City of Lincoln, deviates northwards, crossing the Lincoln - Market Rasen railway line. It follows the outskirts of Lincoln, crossing the B1182 (former A46) at Nettleham. It crosses the A15 north of the Riseholme roundabout, and follows a short section of the A57, then crosses it, near Bishop Bridge. A few hundred metres west it meets the Foss Dyke, which from there a mile north-west is the boundary with North Kesteven. At Saxilby with Ingleby it deviates westwards from the Foss Dyke, and at Broadholme (former Nottinghamshire until 1989) at the B1190 (Tom Otters Lane), it meets Nottinghamshire (Newark and Sherwood). It follows a half-mile section of Ox Pasture Drain north to the A57, which it briefly follows westwards until Kettlethorpe (A156 junction). It crosses the A1133 at Newton on Trent, and under a mile westwards it meets the River Trent and Bassetlaw, a mile north of the former High Marnham Power Station.

Education
The district, similar to North and South Kesteven, has a mixture of comprehensive schools in the south-east of the district and selective schools in Gainsborough (Queen Elizabeth's High School, The Gainsborough Academy) and Caistor. Both grammar schools are in the top ten for A level results in the East Midlands, with Caistor Grammar School getting the best results in this region consistently year on year. It also gets some of the best results in England. These schools offer a standard of state education from ages 11–16 not available in the regions of Lincolnshire directly north of the district (former Lindsey before 1974). Pupils from outside of the district may travel to be educated in Gainsborough from Scunthorpe (12–15 miles via the A159), and (in greater number) to Caistor from Grimsby and Cleethorpes (10–12 miles via the A46). The situation is reversed in the sixth form, with Lincolnshire pupils studying at the John Leggott College in Scunthorpe and the Franklin College, Grimsby. The best comprehensive in this district (and the county) is the William Farr School in Welton, which gets A level results similar to a grammar school.

Transport
Large parts of the district can be accessed from the M180, to the north of the region. The A1500 (Tillbridge Lane) and A631 are the main east–west routes, and avoid busy town centres. The A631, further west, allows passage (through Bassetlaw) to Robin Hood Airport Doncaster Sheffield in the nearby Metropolitan Borough of Doncaster. The north–south route is the A15, officially the straightest road in the UK, following the Roman road Ermine Street.

Tourism
Attractions to the district include the Lincolnshire Wolds. The Lincolnshire Show is held in the district at the Lincolnshire Showground, south of RAF Scampton, which is also the home for the Red Arrows, the Royal Air Force Aerobatic Team.

Demographics

The district has seen steady population growth since 2001, with Gainsborough and the villages north of Lincoln particular points of growth. The population of the district now stands at 95,200 as of 2021.

The district ranked 161 out of 326 local authorities for amounts of deprivation. Part of the Gainsborough South West ward is in the top 5% for deprived areas (Super Output Area) in the country. Gainsborough East and Gainsborough South West wards have the highest levels of unemployment, although the region as a whole has a below-average rate.

16% of employment is in manufacturing, and 6% in agriculture. There are around 3,220 businesses. There are few council houses and house prices are lower than the regional average.

Arms

References

External links

 Public district council meetings on video
 Visit West Lindsey

West Lindsey District
Non-metropolitan districts of Lincolnshire
Local government districts of the East Midlands